La Garçonne (French - the flapper) may be
La Garçonne (novel), French 1920s novel by Victor Margueritte
one of four film adaptations of this novel
La Garçonne (1923 film), censored and even banned by the French authorities.
La Garçonne (1936 film)
La Garçonne (1957 film)
La Garçonne (1988 television film)
Garçonne (magazine), a defunct German magazine for lesbians